Executive Counsel Limited is a business strategy and communications consultancy firm headquartered in Hong Kong. The company advises on public affairs, government relations, lobbying, stakeholder engagement, public relations, sustainability, brand building and corporate communications. It focuses on Asia.

Background 

Executive Counsel Limited was founded in 2003 by communications strategist Timothy J. Peirson-Smith, current Chairman of the Business Policy Unit of the British Chamber of Commerce in Hong Kong.

Prior to 2003, Peirson-Smith was involved in the communications and environmental aspects of many major development projects.

Executive Counsel's blue bowler hat logo is inspired by Edward de Bono's Six Thinking Hats and works by Belgian surrealist René Magritte, particularly The Man in the Bowler Hat and The Son of Man (both 1964).

Focus and Issues 

Executive Counsel Limited has clients from a broad range of sectors, including tourism, accountancy, banking and finance, investment promotion, recruitment, transportation, logistics, IT, environment, healthcare, property, energy and the public sector.

In Hong Kong, Executive Counsel Limited has become known for infrastructure, construction and development, with Managing Director Timothy J. Peirson-Smith a regular commentator on these sectors in local media and the conference circuit.

Executive Counsel Limited is also active in public relations, media campaigns and event planning. Executive Counsel Limited has also provided PR support to the Vienna Representative Office in Hong Kong.

Offices 

 Hong Kong founded in 2003 
 Macau founded in 2007

Notes 

Strategy consulting firms